Meacham Township is located in Marion County, Illinois. As of the 2010 census, its population was 375 and it contained 167 housing units.

Geography 
Meacham Township (T4N R4E) is centered at 38°46'N 88°45'W (38.774, -88.754). Short portions of Interstate Route 57, State Route 37 and the East Fork of the Kaskaskia River cross the township's northwest corner. The north ends of Forbes Lake and Stephen A. Forbes State Park are located at its southern border.

Demographics

Adjacent townships 
 LaClede Township, Fayette County (north)
 Larkinsburg Township, Clay County (northeast)
 Oskaloosa Township, Clay County (east)
 Songer Township, Clay County (southeast)
 Omega Township (south)
 Alma Township (southwest)
 Kinmundy Township (west)
 Lone Grove Township, Fayette County (northwest)

References

External links
US Census
City-data.com
Illinois State Archives

Townships in Marion County, Illinois
Townships in Illinois